Kim Dae-ho is the name of:
 Kim Dae-ho (footballer, born 1988)
 Kim Dae-ho (footballer, born 1994)